Eucort (Eusebio Cortés SA) was a Spanish automobile manufacturer based at Barcelona from 1945 till 1953.

An attempt at creating a "popular car", the first Eucort was based on a prewar DKW design. It featured a 764 cc twin-cylinder two-stroke engine. DKW inspiration was also apparent from the front-wheel-drive layout. The car was available both as a conventionally styled four-door sedan and as a three-door estate.

The last new model was the Victoria of 1950, which had a 1,034 cc three-cylinder engine. By 1951, when the firm ceased production, approximately 1,500 Eucorts has been produced, including taxi and cabriolet versions. The business subsequently went into liquidation.

References
David Burgess Wise, The New Illustrated Encyclopedia of Automobiles.

Defunct motor vehicle manufacturers of Spain
Manufacturing companies based in Barcelona